The Department of the Air Force World Class Athlete Program (WCAP) is a military program designed to support nationally and internationally ranked athlete Airmen and Guardians and prepare them to qualify for the U.S. Olympic team and compete at the highest level of international competition. Additionally, it provides current Olympians an avenue to serve the United States in a uniformed service capacity between training seasons. The program is falls under the DAF Fitness and Sports Division, Air Force Service Center, headquartered at Joint Base San Antonio, Texas.  Program management of WCAP and the Department of the Air Force Shooting Program moved to Colorado Springs, Colorado in the spring of 2022 to better assist athletes and to be closer to the Olympic Training Center and its sister service WCAP Program Managers and Fort Carson, Colorado.

This program enables selected Department of the Air Force military athletes to focus on training and competing in a full-time status in preparation for Olympic competition. The selection process ensures participants are viable Olympic contenders who will serve as Department of the Air Force ambassadors as they compete nationally and internationally.

The name United States Air Force World Class Athlete Program was changed in 2021 to Department of the Air Force World Class Athlete Program when it onboarded its first Space Force service member, fencer, 1st Lieutenant Leanne Singleton-Comfort.

Program management operating location, updated recruitment strategy, refined entry standards and branding refresh reflect significant milestones in 2021–2022.

The DAF WCAP is currently governed by AFI 34-266, Fitness, Sports and World Class Athlete Program and is currently being rewritten as DAFI 34-144 and is scheduled to be published later this year (2022).

Several Department of the Air Force Athlete of the Year award winners were WCAP alumni or program hopefuls.

Air Force WCAP founding

The World Class Athlete Program was first established by the Army as to centrally manage and support athletes under the provisions set in Public Law 84-11 which passed into law in March 1955. PL 84-11 afforded any Armed Forces service members an opportunity to perform at the international level while maintaining a military career.

At a Washington Touchdown Club Awards Banquet, General Ronald Fogleman inquired about the establishment of the WCAP program and asked if the Air Force might have a similar program for Airmen. Less than a year later, in Feb of 1996 the Air Force World Class Athlete Program was established and added to the Department of the Air Force Fitness and Sports portfolio.

Historic highlights
 

The first official WCAP class was 1996. During its inaugural year, the program supported 19 full-time athletes.

Highest Olympic Finish: Second Lieutenant Weston "Seth" Kelsey (Men's Epee, 4th place) 2012 Summer Olympic Games in London, UK.

Recent WCAP Finish: Airman First Class Kelly Curtis (Women's Skeleton, 21st Place) 2022 Winter Olympic Games in Beijing, China.

2019: Introduction of the United States Space Force WCAP.  This program is currently managed by the Air Force WCAP Program Manager.

2022: New branding introduced. This included service specific for Air Force and Space Force Athletes and Olympian WCAP logos.

Current roster

Roster

WCAP Olympians
14 WCAP athletes have represented the United States at the Olympics.

1996 Summer Olympics
Eighteen of the 19 athletes in the program qualified for the Olympic Trials.

Olympians

Alternate

Coaching staff

1998 Winter Olympics
Deborah Nordyke was the only WCAP athlete to make Team USA. She joined the Air Force Alaska Air National Guard in 1987.

2000 Summer Olympics
Thirty-six of 38 athletes qualified for Olympic Trials. One alternate for Olympic skeet.

2002 Winter Olympics
All three athletes qualified for the trials.

2004 Summer Olympics
Twenty-three of 28 athletes qualified for Olympic Trials.

Three athletes were selected for the United States national baseball team. They lost in the quarterfinals of the 2004 Americas Olympic Baseball Qualifying Tournament and did not qualify for the Olympics.

Three alternates.

Olympians

2006 Winter Olympics
All four athletes qualified for the trials.

2008 Summer Olympics
Twenty-three of 24 athletes qualified for Olympic Trials.

Three alternates.

Olympians

2010 Winter Olympics
Two athletes qualified for the trials. One was first alternate in Bobsled.

2012 Summer Olympics
Twelve  of 14 athletes qualified for Olympic Trials. Zero made the Olympic team.

Olympians

2014 Winter Olympics
One athlete qualified for the trials. He was first alternate in Bobsled.

2016 Summer Olympics
There were 20 WCAP athletes, five competed in the trials and one went to the Olympics.

2018 Winter Olympics
No WCAP athletes qualified for the trials.

2020 Summer Olympics
Due to COVID-19 pandemic caused the 2020 Tokyo games to be delayed.. The Air Force WCAP retained athletes in the program however, no Air Force athletes were able to qualify for the Olympics.

2022 Winter Olympics
There were 6 WCAP athletes, six competed in the trials and one went to the Olympics.

Kelly Curtis was the only WCAP athlete to compete in the Olympics.

Summary

References

Sources
Air Force World Class Athlete Program
Public Law 84-11

External links
https://myairforcelife.com/sports-world-class-athletes/ Official website
https://DAFsports.com